Dwingelderveld National Park is a national park of the Netherlands in the province of Drenthe, founded in 1991. It is the largest wet heathland of Western-Europe. Dwingelderveld is also designated as a Natura 2000-area.

Archeology and history
Dwingelderveld was used by early inhabitants for religious purposes and agriculture. Celtic fields and burial mounds are still clearly recognizable in the field. Later the area was used as a transport route from Germany to the Netherlands, some of the old trails can still be found in the National Park. Nevertheless, the area has never been used intensively by humans. In the 1930s, there were reclamation plans, but nature conservation organisations purchased a part of the area to save it. Other parts have been in use for forestry.

Landscape
The most characteristic features of the park are the large heath lands. The structure of the terrain is quite varied with relatively high sandy hills and wet lower parts, including many fens. Some of these fens are pingo-ruins from the last glacial.

In former days the heath was in use as a part of the agricultural system. At present it is not the case anymore so new ways have to be found to keep the heath in its present condition and to prevent the growth of trees. Sheep are still in use - there is  a sheepfold in the park, but also cows are used to graze, and special machines are developed to manage the heath. In the park, one of largest Dutch juniper thickets can be found.

Vegetation and wildlife
In the park four 'heath species' are rather common: Calluna vulgaris, Erica tetralix Empetrum nigrum and Andromeda polifolia. There are also Rosera intermedia, Eriophorum vaginatum, Gentiana pneumonanthe and several orchid species.
In the Dwingelderveld area, three snake species occur and several rare butterflies.

Recreation
In the national park is a visitor centre. In addition, there are many camp sites, hotels and restaurants. There is also an astronomy centre, the Planetron, accessible to tourists.

References

External links 
 Official website

Protected areas established in 1991
1991 establishments in the Netherlands
National parks of the Netherlands
Tourist attractions in Drenthe
Geography of Drenthe
Westerveld